The Red Army Faction (RAF) existed in West Germany from 1970 to 1998, committing numerous crimes, especially in the autumn of 1977, which led to a national crisis that became known as the "German Autumn". The RAF was founded in 1970 by Andreas Baader, Gudrun Ensslin, Ulrike Meinhof, Horst Mahler, and others. The first generation of the organization was commonly referred to by the press and the government as the "Baader-Meinhof Gang", a name the group did not use to refer to itself.

The RAF was responsible for 34 deaths, including many secondary targets such as chauffeurs and bodyguards, and many injuries in its almost 30 years of activity.

Eileen MacDonald stated in Shoot the Women First (1991) that women made up about fifty percent of the membership of the Red Army Faction and about eighty percent of the RAF's supporters. This was higher than other similar groups in West Germany, in which women made up about thirty percent of the membership.

First generation Red Army Faction (1970–75)

Founding first generation members 
Andreas Baader (6 May 1943 – 18 October 1977) was a co-founding member of the RAF. Baader was involved in bank raids and arson. He was arrested and tried at Stammheim Prison alongside Gudrun Ensslin, Ulrike Meinhof and Jan-Carl Raspe, and given three sentences of life imprisonment. He died in Stammheim prison on 18 October 1977. Accounts of his death vary. Some state he committed suicide in prison using a handgun. Others claim he was murdered in an extrajudicial killing. He and Ensslin were lovers.

Gudrun Ensslin (15 August 1940 – 18 October 1977) was a co-founding member of the RAF. She was involved in bank robbery|bank raids and arson. She helped free Baader from police custody on 30 April 1970. Ensslin was given three times life imprisonment when charged at Stammheim. She died in Stammheim prison on 18 October 1977. Accounts of her death vary. Some state she committed suicide in prison by hanging. Others claim she was murdered in an extrajudicial killing. She and Baader were lovers.

Ulrike Meinhof (7 October 1934 – 9 May 1976) was a co-founding member of the RAF. She was a well-known journalist who wrote for and was editor of konkret. She was married to Klaus Rainer Röhl. She helped free Andreas Baader from police custody on 30 April 1970. She was involved in car theft, arson and bank robbery. She was arrested. Meinhof was given an eight-year prison sentence for freeing Baader. She was found hanged in her prison cell on 9 May 1976. The formal claim was "suicide by hanging", though the autopsy report was controversial.

Other first generation members
Jan-Carl Raspe (24 July 1944 – 18 October 1977) was an early member of the Baader-Meinhof gang and was captured a short while before both Holger Meins and Andreas Baader were arrested in Frankfurt in 1972 (he had been the driver of their Porsche Targa). Alongside Baader, Ensslin and Meinhof he was sentenced to life imprisonment at Stammheim. Raspe supposedly committed suicide in his cell using a 9 mm Heckler & Koch handgun on 18 October 1977, however, it is also claimed that he was murdered in an extrajudicial killing.

Holger Meins (26 October 1941 – 9 November 1974) was a leftist cinematography student in West Germany and was tired of being harassed by police over his political views. He joined the Baader-Meinhof gang quite early on along with Beate Sturm and was seen somewhat as a leading member. In 1971 he was arrested alongside Raspe and Baader during a shoot-out with the police in Frankfurt. In prison the Baader-Meinhof gang called for a hunger strike, as they felt they were being treated unfairly by the government. Meins died on 11 November 1974 as a result of the hunger strike. He weighed less than 100 pounds at the time of his death; he was over six feet (1.8 m) tall. His death sparked rage amongst RAF members everywhere.

Astrid Proll (born 29 May 1947) is the younger sister of Thorwald Proll and met Baader and Ensslin through him. Proll was involved in a bank robbery and also was an expert car thief. She was the getaway driver for Baader after he was freed from police custody by Ensslin, Meinhof, Ingrid Schubert and Irene Goergens in 1970. She was arrested in Hamburg on 6 May and was imprisoned but released for health reasons. However, she quickly absconded to England where she worked in various jobs. Proll was discovered and arrested by the Special Branch in 1978 and returned to West Germany in 1979 to fight her case there. She was given five-and-a-half years imprisonment on account of bank robbery and falsifying documents. However, she had already spent at least two-thirds of that time in German and English prisons, and therefore was released immediately. She did not rejoin the Red Army Faction.

Ingrid Schubert (27 November 1944 – 13 November 1977) was involved in freeing Baader from police custody in 1970 (along with Ensslin, Meinhof, Irene Goergens and Peter Homann) and also took part in a few bank raids. Later that year, police discovered an RAF hideout in Berlin and entered the hideout to find Schubert there. She produced fake ID but when searched a gun was found on her person. She was subsequently arrested and sentenced to thirteen years in prison for freeing Baader. After Meinhof's death in 1976 Schubert was transferred to Stammheim to soothe and console Ensslin; she was then transferred to Stadelheim Prison in Munich after Ensslin, Raspe and Baader committed suicide on 18 October 1977. Two weeks later on 13 November 1977 Schubert too was found dead, hanging in her prison cell.

Thomas "Tommy" Weissbecker (February 1944 – 2 March 1972) was an associate of Horst Mahler and a minor member of the Baader-Meinhof gang. He was first involved with the Blues-Scene and West Berlin Tupamaros but in July 1971 he met with some RAF members and together with Angela Luther he expressed interest and started working with the RAF. In 1971 he was charged and acquitted with assaulting a Springer journalist. Later, on 2 March 1972, Weissbecker, along with Carmen Roll, was stopped by police outside a hotel in Augsburg. Weissbecker was shot dead by the police when he reached into his pocket, supposedly to grab his gun. However Stefan Aust claims that he was simply reaching into his pocket to produce ID. On 12 May 1972, over two months after Weissbecker's death, RAF members bombed a police station in Augsburg and a Criminal Investigations Agency in Munich. They claimed responsibility for the bombings in the name of the 'Tommy Weissbecker Kommando'.

Petra Schelm (16 August 1950 – 15 July 1971) joined the Baader-Meinhof group along with her boyfriend Manfred Grashof. She travelled to Jordan alongside the rest of the Faction and trained in urban guerrilla warfare with the PLO in May 1970. On 15 July 1971 Schelm was driving through Hamburg with Werner Hoppe when she sped her BMW through a police roadblock. The police gave chase and forced her BMW off the road. Schelm and Hoppe ran off in different directions. Hoppe was followed by a police helicopter and was caught and arrested, but Schelm did not surrender. She threw away a jacket she was holding to reveal a handgun and fired at the police, but the police returned fire. Jillian Becker states that Schelm was killed by a burst of gunfire from a submachine gun, but Stefan Aust states that it was a single bullet wound to the head that killed Schelm. Additionally, a closeup photograph of Schelm taken at the scene immediately after her death (probably by a police photographer) clearly shows a single gunshot wound through the eye. Some RAF members called for retribution for Schelm's death. She was buried at a cemetery in Spandau. At her funeral, fifty or so youths laid a red flag on her grave, though policemen later came and removed it.

Irmgard Möller (13 May 1947) bombed the Campbell Barracks in Heidelberg on 24 May 1972. She claimed responsibility in the name of the Commando 15 July (the date of Petra Schelm's death) in honour of Schelm.

Christa Eckes was arrested on 4 February 1974 when the police raided RAF safehouses simultaneously in Hamburg and Frankfurt together with Helmut Pohl, Ilse Stachowiak, Eberhard Becker, Margrit Schiller, Kay-Werner Allnach and Wolfgang Beer. On 28 September 1977, she was sentenced to seven years in prison. After her release she was arrested again on 2 July 1984 in Frankfurt, after several RAF members accidentally discharged a gun into the apartment below their safe house. The others arrested were Helmut Pohl, Stefan Frey, Ingrid Jakobsmeier, Barbara Ernst and Ernst-Volker Staub.

Angela Luther (born 1940) was first involved with the Blues-Scene and West Berlin Tupamaros, but in July 1971, she met with some RAF members, and together with Thomas Weissbecker she expressed interest and started working with the RAF. On 12 May 1972 she participated in the bombing of a police station in Augsburg together with Irmgard Möller, and on 24 May 1972 she was involved in the bombing of the officers club and the Campbell Barracks in Heidelberg.

Second generation Red Army Faction (1975–1982) 
By 1972 a large number of the core members of the Baader-Meinhof Gang had been captured and imprisoned. However, new members swelled the dwindling ranks of the Gang. These revolutionaries mostly had similar backgrounds to the first generation, e.g. they were middle class and frequently students. Most of them joined the Gang after their own groups dissolved e.g. the Socialist Patients' Collective (SPK) and Movement 2 June (J2M).

Former SPK members
The SPK, the leftist, 'therapy-through-violence' group, dissolved in 1971, and those members who had turned militant forged links and joined with the Baader-Meinhof Gang. Brigitte Mohnhaupt, Klaus Jünschke Carmen Roll, and Gerhard Müller had already joined as part of the first generation of the RAF but originally started in SPK.

Siegfried Hausner (24 January 1952 – 5 May 1975) was a leading member of the SPK especially involved with explosives. He took part in a bombing of the Axel Springer Verlag in 1971 and was the leader of the West German embassy siege in Stockholm in 1975, when he was fatally injured after TNT wiring the embassy was accidentally detonated.

Brigitte Mohnhaupt (born 24 June 1949) became a leader amongst the second generation RAF and was involved in some of their most serious crimes (such as the murder of Jürgen Ponto) and was a key perpetrator during the German Autumn.

Sieglinde Hofmann (born 14 March 1945) became an important figure of the second generation RAF and was personally involved in the kidnap and murder of Hanns-Martin Schleyer, his driver and three accompanying policemen.

Klaus Jünschke (born September 1947) was a student member of the SPK, who managed to escape arrest when police came after certain members of the SPK in 1971. He joined the RAF with his militant girlfriend Elisabeth von Dyck and was involved in at least one bank robbery (in December 1971 in Kaiserslautern – alongside Ingeborg Barz and Wolfgang Grundmann).

Hanna-Elise Krabbe (born October 1945) was born in Bad Bentheim. She was a member of the IZRU (the group which succeeded the SPK) and was the elder sister of Friederike Krabbe, another member. Hanna-Elise Krabbe took part in the West German embassy siege in Stockholm. She was the only female member involved in the siege. Her role during the siege was to guard the hostages. She was arrested when the siege failed and was sentenced on 20 July 1977, to twice life imprisonment. She was released from prison in 1996, after serving 21 years.

Friederike Krabbe (born 31 May 1950) was born in Bad Bentheim. She is the younger sister of Hanna-Elise Krabbe, another member. Friederike Krabbe studied psychology, pedagogy and sociology in Berlin from 1970 to 1973 and then went on to study medicine for a while in Heidelberg. She was involved with the SPK and after its dissolution, the RAF. She is believed to have been one of the RAF members who kidnapped Hanns Martin Schleyer. According to Monika Helbing, after Schleyer was executed in 1977, Krabbe fled to Baghdad along with Elisabeth von Dyck. Around this time Krabbe disappeared, and her whereabouts are still unknown today.

Carmen Roll was a member of the SPK and the RAF. She was especially involved in 'working circle explosives' in which she achieved limited success with Siegfried Hausner when they managed to manufacture a small amount of TNT in December 1970 in the University Institute of Physiology. In February 1971 Roll, along with Hausner, planned to bomb the President of the Federal Republic's special train in Heidelberg station, but she arrived too late with the explosives, and the plot failed. On 2 March 1972, Roll was spotted with Tommy Weissbecker outside a hotel in Augsburg. Weissbecker was shot dead and Roll was eventually arrested. Two weeks later to sedate her when she resisted fingerprinting she was given a near-fatal dose of ether by prison doctors. In 1976 Roll was freed from prison. She moved to Italy and became a nurse.

Lutz Taufer (born March 1944) had links with the SPK, and he protested against the supposed torture of political prisoners in West Germany in 1974. In 1975 he took part in the West German embassy siege in Stockholm and was arrested after the siege failed. He was subsequently imprisoned. In July 1977 he was sentenced to twice life imprisonment for his participation in the siege, by a Düsseldorf Court. He was released in 1996.  Taufer has been living in Brazil with his sister since 1999.

Elisabeth von Dyck (October 1951 – 4 May 1979) was a member of the SPK and of the RAF. She was born in Nuremberg. She was the girlfriend of Klaus Jünschke and later of lawyer Klaus Croissant. She was involved with the 'committees against torture' in 1974. In 1975 von Dyck, along with Siegfried Haag, was arrested on suspicion of smuggling weapons out of Switzerland and served six months in a detention centre in Cologne before being released. However, a warrant went out for her arrest in 1977. von Dyck went underground, and Monika Helbing stated that around this time she fled to Baghdad for a while with Friederike Krabbe. von Dyck returned to West Germany sometime between 1977 and 1979, and on 4 May 1979, von Dyck entered a Nuremberg house, thought to have been an RAF hideout, which was under police surveillance. The police shot von Dyck through the back, killing her. A gun was found on her body. von Dyck was shot even though she was only suspected of being involved with the RAF, and was not a high-priority on the wanted list. However, it was alleged that the police shot her after she first drew a pistol and aimed it at them.

Ulrich Wessel (9 January 1946 – 24 April 1975) was the son of a rich Hamburg businessman. Wessel was described as a dandy, and he was a millionaire by inheritance. He was involved with the SPK and took part in the West German embassy siege in Stockholm. He died during the siege when the TNT was accidentally exploded; the force of the explosion startled him so much that he dropped a grenade he was holding and it exploded on him. He died soon afterwards.

Bernhard Braun had early on come into contact with the RAF via the West Berlin Tupamaros but was also close to the Movement 2 June. On 9 June 1972, Bernhard Braun and Brigitte Mohnhaupt were arrested in West Berlin. He was one of the 26 members who were supposed to be released as a result of the West German embassy siege in Stockholm.

Former J2M members
Movement 2 June was founded in 1972 and was allied with the RAF but was ideologically anarchist as opposed to the Marxist RAF. In the early 1980s, the movement disbanded and many members then joined the RAF.

Ingrid Barabass was first arrested alongside Sieglinde Hofmann in Paris in 1980 following a raid on a RAF safehouse. She was then again arrested in Frankfurt on 4 July 1985. She had been spotted in Paris shortly before René Audran's assassination by the Action directe, a French ally to the RAF.

Ingrid Siepmann (born 12 June 1944) was in 1974 sentenced to 13 years in prison for robbing a bank in Hamburg on 6 August 1973 together with Ilse Stachowiak. On 3 March 1975, she was released as part of the Peter Lorenz kidnapping and exchange together with Rolf Pohle, Verena Becker, Rolf Heissler and Gabriele Kröcher-Tiedemann and ended up in South Yemen. She then lived in a training camp for the Popular Front for the Liberation of Palestine (PLFP) and should have been part of the abduction of the Austrian textile industrial Walter Palmers in November 1977 but was not involved when it was put into action. She is believed to have been killed by an Israeli airstrike in 1982 in Lebanon.

Juliane Plambeck (16 July 1952 – 25 July 1980) was arrested together with members of Movement 2 June Inge Viett and Ralf Reinders on 9 September 1975. They are all suspects in the Peter Lorenz kidnapping. On 7 July 1976, she along with RAF member Monika Berberich and J2M members Gabriele Rollnick and Inge Viett overpowered a guard and scaled the wall, escaping from the Lehrter Women's Prison in West Berlin. On 25 July 1980, Plambeck, then a RAF member, and Wolfgang Beer were killed in a traffic accident outside of Bietigheim-Bissingen. In the car several weapons, one of which had been used in the abduction of Hanns Martin Schleyer, were found, next to fake identification documents and vehicle registration.

Rolf Heißler (born 3 June 1948) became acquainted with Brigitte Mohnhaupt in the late 1960s and first became a member of the Munich Tupamaros and later joined the RAF together with his ex-wife Mohnhaupt, but he was also closely acquainted with the Movement 2 June. On 13 April 1971 he was involved in a bank robbery in Munich but was arrested. In 1972 he was sentenced to a six-year imprisonment. On 3 March 1975, he was released as part of the Peter Lorenz kidnapping and exchange together with Rolf Pohle, Verena Becker, Ingrid Siepmann and Gabriele Kröcher-Tiedemann and ended up in South Yemen. In October 1976 he returned undetected to Germany. According to Peter-Jürgen Boock Heißler and Stefan Wisniewski shot Hanns Martin Schleyer. On 1 November 1978 he and Adelheid Schulz shot two Dutch customs officers, Dionysius de Jong and Johannes Goemans, at a passport control in Kerkrade and seriously injured two more. de Jong died instantly, and Goemans died on 14 November 1978. When he was arrested on 9 June 1979 in Frankfurt, Heissler was seriously injured by a shot in the head but survived. On 10 November 1982, he was sentenced to two life terms plus 15 years for murders and membership in the RAF. On 25 October 2001, he was released on probation.

Rolf Pohle (4 January 1942 – 7 February 2004) was first arrested on 17 December 1971 when he attempted to buy thirty-two firearms in a gun shop in Neu-Ulm which the police claimed were meant for the RAF. In 1974 he was sentenced to four years in prison because of membership in a criminal organisation, weapon possession and support activities for the RAF. On 3 March 1975, he was released as part of the Peter Lorenz kidnapping and exchange together with Rolf Heissler, Verena Becker, Ingrid Siepmann and Gabriele Kröcher-Tiedemann and ended up in South Yemen. On 21 July 1976, he was arrested again in Athens but first extradited to Germany on 1 October after a lengthy negotiation with Greece. On top of his original conviction, he was given a further three years and three months. He was released in 1982 and returned to Greece two years later. Until the outbreak of cancer, he worked as a teacher and translator. Pohle himself continued to deny any profound relations with the RAF. He died on 7 February 2004.

Gabriele Kröcher-Tiedemann (18 May 1951 – 7 October 1995)

The Haag/Mayer Group
The Haag/Mayer Group was a minor group of members within the second generation of the RAF. They were recruited by Siegfried Haag, who organised the regrouping of the RAF in the mid 1970s together with Roland Mayer before Brigitte Mohnhaupt took over the leadership after their arrest in 1976. Knut Folkerts from SPK and Verena Becker from J2M were also part of this group.

Siegfried Haag (born March 1945) was a sympathetic lawyer for the first generation of the RAF, turned member by 1974. Haag became something of a leader amongst the second generation RAF until he was arrested together with Roland Mayer on 30 November 1976 on the Frankfurt-Kassel highway. On 19 December 1979 he was sentenced to 15 years of imprisonment. In detention, he distanced himself from the RAF. In February 1987 the rest of his punishment to the probation was suspended because he was seriously ill.

Roland Mayer helped Siegfried Haag regroup the RAF when most of the first generation had been arrested and imprisoned. He was arrested with Haag on 30 November 1976 on the Frankfurt-Kassel highway. He was later sentenced to 12 years of imprisonment.

Günter Sonnenberg (born 21 July 1954) participated in the murder of Siegfried Buback and his two companions on 7 April 1977. On 3 May 1977, he and Verena Becker were captured in Singen. The arrest ended in a shoot out with the police and Sonnenberg was seriously injured and suffered brain damage. On 26 April 1978 he was sentenced to twice life imprisonment. In May 1992 he was released on probation.

Uwe Folkerts (born 1948) was arrested on 5 May 1977 together with Johannes Thimme in connection with the Siegfried Buback assassination. In late 1978 he was found guilty of lending his car to Adelheid Schulz and Sabine Schmitz and sentenced to sixteen months imprisonment.

Waltraud Boock (born 1951), wife of Peter-Jürgen Boock, was arrested on 13 December 1976 following an unsuccessful bank raid in Vienna together with Sabine Schmitz. On 4 February 1977 she was sentenced to 15 years.

Other second generation members
Sigrid Sternebeck (born 19 June 1949) moved to Hamburg in 1971 and met Susanne Albrecht, Silke Maier-Witt, Karl-Heinz Dellwo, Monika Helbing and Bernhard Rössner. In 1977 she joined the RAF and went underground. In 1980 she left the RAF and received asylum and a new identity in East Germany. She was arrested on 15 June 1990 in Schwedt together with her husband, Ralf Baptist Friedrich. After her arrest, she cooperated with the police and prosecutors and on 22 June 1992 sentenced to eight and a half years in prison due to her participation in a murder attempt on Alexander Haig and the assassination of Hanns Martin Schleyer. Today she lives under a different name in Northern Germany.

Silke Maier-Witt (born 21 January 1950) only had a minor involvement in the kidnap of Hanns-Martin Schleyer and broke away from the RAF in 1979. She escaped into East Germany to avoid arrest and lived there until her capture in 1990. She served five years in jail before going on to work as a peace activist in Kosovo.

Volker Speitel (born 1950) and his wife Angelika both joined the RAF in the 1970s. He worked in Klaus Croissant's office. Where his wife was an active member, he was more of a supporter of the RAF. He was arrested in 1977 together with Rosemarie Preiss on a train in Puttgarden and cooperated with the police and prosecutors and received the status of a crown witness. He was sentenced to three years and two months for supporting the RAF, and he was released from prison in 1979.

Willi-Peter Stoll (12 June 1950 – 6 September 1978) was an RAF member who was one of the men directly involved with the kidnapping of Hanns-Martin Schleyer. He was said to have changed mentally after the event, and he became depressed and withdrew from the RAF. On 6 September 1978, Stoll was having dinner in a Chinese restaurant in the Red Light District in Düsseldorf when he was approached by police. He drew his gun and a shoot-out followed that resulted in Stoll's death.

Monika Helbing (born 16 November 1953) joined the RAF in 1974 and was involved in the occupation of the Amnesty International offices in Hamburg. In 1976 she went underground and with Christian Klar and other members form the "Southern German cell" of the RAF. She was involved in the preparation and follow-up of the kidnapping of Hanns Martin Schleyer in fall 1977. In 1980 she left the RAF and received asylum and a new identity in East Germany. She was arrested on 14 June 1990 in Frankfurt an der Oder and later on 24 February 1992 she was sentenced to seven years in prison. After her arrest, she cooperated with the police and prosecutors and testified extensively. She was released in 1995 and today lives under a different name.

Christof Wackernagel (born 27 August 1951) joined the RAF in 1977, and on 11 November 1977 he was arrested together with Gert Schneider in Amsterdam. A year later they were extradited to West Germany and Wackernagel charged with participation in the Zweibrücken courthouse bombing amongst other things. On 5 September 1980 he was sentenced to 15 years in prison but released in 1987.

Hans-Peter Konieczny was recruited by lawyer Jörg Lang and had just joined the RAF in February 1972, when he on 7 July the same year was cornered by the police in Offenbach. He was persuaded to cooperate and set up Klaus Jünschke and Irmgard Möller, who was easily captured by the police. Konieczny was released from custody two months later.

Johannes Thimme (1956–1985) became affiliated with support scene of the RAF in 1977 and served several prison sentences. In 1985 he was killed and Claudia Wannersdorfer seriously injured when a bomb he was helping to plant at the Association for the Development of Air and Space Industries in Stuttgart exploded prematurely.

Third generation Red Army Faction (1982–1993)
This generation was active mostly throughout the 1980s and early 1990s until the group disbanded in 1998.

Eva Haule (born 1954) went underground in 1984, was arrested in 1986, and after being sentenced remained in prison until 2007.

Wolfgang Grams (born 1953) and Birgit Hogefeld (born 1956) were considered the leaders of the third generation. Both were arrested in Bad Kleinen in 1993, during a botched operation. But Grams died in controversial circumstances. After being sentenced for her involved in the assassination of Detlef Rohwedder, Hogefeld remained in prison until 2011.

Ernst-Volker Staub (born 1954), Daniela Klette (born 1958), and Burkhard Garweg (born 1 September 1968) are the three former members of RAF still on Germany's most-wanted list. In January 2016 the trio were identified as the suspected perpetrators of a bungled attempt to rob an armoured security van near Bremen in June 2015, and they are suspects in further robberies. These crimes are not considered to have a terrorist background.

References

Further reading 

 
Members